Whose Baby? is a 1917 American silent comedy film directed by Clarence G. Badger and starring Gloria Swanson.

Cast

Reception
Like many American films of the time, Whose Baby? was subject to cuts by city and state film censorship boards. The Chicago Board of Censors cut a scene of a heavy woman sliding down a railing, two scenes of her falling in a gymnasium, and a closeup of her backed up against a wall.

References

External links

1917 films
1917 comedy films
1917 short films
American silent short films
American black-and-white films
Films directed by Clarence G. Badger
Keystone Studios films
Films produced by Mack Sennett
American comedy short films
Silent American comedy films
1910s American films